The Myanmar Open was a professional golf tournament on the Asian Tour. It was founded in 1996, and was played every year until 2005. Between 2006 and 2015 it was only contested in 2010, 2012 and 2013.

The tournament returned in February 2016, sponsored by Leopalace21 and co-sanctioned by the Asian Tour and Japan Golf Tour.

Winners

Notes

References

External links
Coverage on the Asian Tour's official site
Coverage on the Japan Golf Tour's official site

Former Asian Tour events
Former Japan Golf Tour events
Golf tournaments in Myanmar
Sport in Myanmar
1996 establishments in Myanmar
Recurring sporting events established in 1996
Recurring sporting events disestablished in 2018